The 1930 World Fencing Championships were held in Liège, Belgium.

Medal summary

Men's events

Women's events

References

World Fencing Championships
1930 in Belgian sport
F
Sports competitions in Brussels